The Legend of Lady Yang is a Hong Kong television series based on the romance between Emperor Xuanzong of the Tang dynasty and his consort Yang Yuhuan. The series was produced by TVB and it stars Anne Heung, Kwong Wa, Melissa Ng, Florence Kwok & Louis Yuen as the casts of this series. It was first aired on TVB Jade from February to March 2000 in Hong Kong.

Plot
Falling for the reigning Emperor of Tang during a chanced encounter, orphan Yeung Yuk Wan's dreams seem to come true when she is summoned into the imperial palace as a candidate for Emperor Xuanzong's consort selection. However, Yeung quickly finds that the palace can be a cold and ruthless place where jealous consort and officials alike duel for power making the Emperor's favor as much desired as it is potentially dangerous for the enemies it brings. Thrown into the middle of the constant struggle for the Emperor's good graces, the hostility of a conniving palace soon becomes a harsh reality for Yeung who finds that in a world where seemingly everyone has something to hide, trusted allies are as much a threat as hostile enemies. With the help of Yeung's cousin, 	Yeung Chiu, who enters the palace as an official, Yeung and the Emperor fight to embrace their seemingly tragic love in a world that appears determined to keep them apart but neither they nor their allies are prepared for the full extent of what lays in store for them as their actions unknowingly set in motion a series of events that would bring about the An Lushan Rebellion.

Cast
 Note: Some of the characters' names are in Cantonese romanisation.

Yang Yuk-wan's Family

Palace

External links
  The Legend of Lady Yang official page on TVB's website
  The Legend of Lady Yang on Sina.com

2000 Hong Kong television series debuts
2000 Hong Kong television series endings
TVB dramas
Television series set in the Tang dynasty